The Sutterellaceae are a family of the Betaproteobacteria. Cells of Sutterellaceae are Gram-negative, oxidase- and catalase-negative, and grow under microaerophilic or anaerobic atmospheres.

References

Burkholderiales